Izvorașu River may refer to:

 Izvorașu, a tributary of the Bega Poienilor in Timiș County
 Izvorașu, a tributary of the Izvorul Dorului in Prahova County

See also 
 Izvor River (disambiguation)
 Izvorul River (disambiguation)
 Izvoare River (disambiguation)
 Izvoarele River (disambiguation)